The Battle of Phillora was a large tank battle fought during the Indo-Pakistani War of 1965. It commenced on 10 September when the Indian 1st Armoured Division, with four armoured regiments and supporting forces under command, attacked positions in the Sialkot sector held by Pakistani 6th Armoured Division. After three days the Pakistanis withdrew with the loss of 66 tanks. The Indians admitted to the loss of 6 Centurions.

The battle coincided with the Battle of Asal Uttar where the Indians were again successful. It was followed by the Battle of Chawinda, where the Indian offensive was halted. On 22 September a ceasefire came into force.

Battle
The battle commenced on 10 September 1965 when Indian troops launched a massive attack in the Phillora sector headed by Indian 1st Armoured Division. Equipped with four armoured regiments, and with a motorised infantry brigade attached, the division faced stiff opposition from the Pakistani 6th Armoured Division. Pakistani aircraft attacked the Indian forces. Their tanks suffered little damage while the supporting transport and infantry columns were harder hit. Over the next two days there was intense fighting before the outnumbered Pakistani troops made a tactical retreat towards Chawinda. At this point India claimed to have destroyed 6 Pakistani tanks.

According to ex-Pakistan Army Major and military historian A.H. Amin the Pakistani armour failed at the battle of Phillora:

Major Amin also criticised India for its strategic miscalculation:

Result
On 12 September the battle ended in a decisive victory for the Indian Army with the Pakistani forces retreating and regrouping to put up a last stand at Chawinda A day before, the Indian Army had experienced another victory at Asal Uttar when they successfully thwarted a Pakistani offensive in the Khem Karan sector. The continued thrust by the Indian Army into Pakistani territory finally culminated in the Battle of Chawinda, where the Indian army's advance was halted. On 22 September the United Nations Security Council unanimously passed a resolution that called for an unconditional ceasefire from both nations. The same day a ceasefire agreement was signed and hostilities ceased. The war ended the following day. India still retained almost 200 square miles (500 square kilometres) of Pakistani territory in the Sialkot sector including the villages of Phillora, Pagowal, Maharajke, Gadgor and Bajagrahi. They were returned to Pakistan after the Tashkent Declaration.

Notes

References

Battles of Indo-Pakistani wars
Indo-Pakistani War of 1965
1965 in India
Tank battles involving India
Tank battles involving Pakistan
History of Punjab, Pakistan (1947–present)
September 1965 events in Asia